Michael Travis (born 6 May 1993) is a South African soccer player who plays as a defender for Berwick Rangers. He has previously played for Forfar Athletic, Livingston and Arbroath and has also played as a trialist for Montrose.

Career

Livingston
A member of the under-19 team Travis made his first team debut on 23 July 2011 as a substitute in Livingston's 5–0 win against Airdrie United in the Challenge Cup. He appeared again as a sub in the next round against Stirling. He made his league debut in the Scottish First Division as a substitute on 24 September against Partick Thistle. He was released by the club at the end of the 2011–12 season.

Arbroath
In July 2012, Travis signed for Scottish Second Division side Arbroath. On 8 November 2014, Travis announced that he had left Arbroath. After leaving Arbroath, Travis played as a trialist for Forfar Athletic and Montrose.

Forfar Athletic
In January 2015, Travis signed for Scottish League One side Forfar Athletic.

Edinburgh City
After playing for the club as a trialist in a match just two days previous, Travis officially signed for Scottish League Two side Edinburgh City on 9 January 2022.

Berwick Rangers
Travis signed for Berwick Rangers in September 2022.

Career statistics

Personal life
He is the cousin of Scottish international footballer Callum Paterson.

References

1993 births
Living people
South African soccer players
Association football defenders
F.C. Edinburgh players
Livingston F.C. players
Arbroath F.C. players
Forfar Athletic F.C. players
Montrose F.C. players
Berwick Rangers F.C. players
Scottish Football League players
Sportspeople from Pietermaritzburg
Scottish Professional Football League players